George Stevenson may refer to:

 George Stevenson (Australian politician) (1839–1893), South Australian MHA; journalist in SA and New South Wales
 George Stevenson (British politician) (born 1938), Labour Party politician in the United Kingdom
 George Stephenson (Confederate Marine)
 George Stevenson (cricketer) (1876–1938), English cricketer
 George Stevenson (editor) (1799–1856), South Australian pioneer newspaper editor, secretary to Governor Hindmarsh
 George Stevenson (footballer) (1905–1990), Scottish football player and manager (Motherwell)
 George John Stevenson (1818–1888), English bookseller, headmaster, author and hymnologist
 George Stevenson (Texas politician) in the Twenty-first Texas Legislature
 George Stevenson (priest) (1763–1825), an Anglican priest in Ireland
 George Stevenson (rugby union) (1933–2012), a Scotland international rugby union player

See also
 George Stephenson (disambiguation)